Chapman Freeman (October 8, 1832 – March 22, 1904) was a Republican member of the U.S. House of Representatives from Pennsylvania.

Biography
Chapman Freeman was born in Philadelphia.  In 1851, he graduated from Central High School as a "distinguished student" of the 26th session, giving a speech at the graduation ceremony, which was held at the Musical Fund Hall. He went on to study law, but engaged in mercantile pursuits until he entered the United States Navy as acting assistant paymaster in 1863.

In 1864, he resigned due to his impaired health, and subsequently resumed the study of law. He was then admitted to the bar in 1867 and, in 1873, became one of the commissioners of the Centennial in Vienna, Austria, during which time he represented the city of Philadelphia.

He was elected in 1874 as a Republican to the 44th Congress and served two terms.  He declined to be a candidate for renomination in 1878.

References

 Retrieved on 2009-5-16
The Political Graveyard

1832 births
1904 deaths
Politicians from Philadelphia
United States Navy sailors
Pennsylvania lawyers
Republican Party members of the United States House of Representatives from Pennsylvania
19th-century American politicians
Central High School (Philadelphia) alumni